Rudy Schulze (31 October 1928 – 12 July 2011) was a Canadian sports shooter. He competed in the 50 metre rifle, prone event at the 1968 Summer Olympics.

References

1928 births
2011 deaths
Canadian male sport shooters
Olympic shooters of Canada
Shooters at the 1968 Summer Olympics
Sportspeople from Berlin
German emigrants to Canada
20th-century Canadian people